Walter Mack (born 4 January 1953) is a German former swimmer. He competed in the men's 200 metre butterfly at the 1972 Summer Olympics.

References

External links
 

1953 births
Living people
German male swimmers
Olympic swimmers of West Germany
Swimmers at the 1972 Summer Olympics
Sportspeople from Bonn